Fear ( or ) is a 1954 German-Italian drama film directed by Roberto Rossellini and starring his wife Ingrid Bergman. It is loosely based on the Stefan Zweig novella Fear. Rossellini created it because he wanted to explore the reconstruction of Germany from both a material and moral standpoint ten years after making his previous German film Germany, Year Zero. The film is noirish with aspects reminiscent of Hitchcock and German Expressionism.

Plot
Irene is the wife of a pharmaceutics manager. When she decides to leave her lover, she is blackmailed by a harpy. She does everything in her power to conceal the truth, without knowing that her husband already knows everything and is sadistically enjoying the situation behind her back.

Cast
 Ingrid Bergman as Irene Wagner
 Mathias Wieman as Professor Albert Wagner
 Renate Mannhardt as Luisa Vidor, alias Johann Schultze
 Kurt Kreuger as Erich Baumann
 Elise Aulinger as Haushaelterin
 Edith Schultze-Westrum
 Steffi Stroux (credited as Steffi Struck)
 Annelore Wied
 Klaus Kinski as Cabaret Performer

Production
Fear was shot simultaneously in English and German language and released as Fear in the international, English-language version and as Angst in Germany.

Reception
The film did not do well when it was released in Italy and Germany. Consequently, the Italian distributor edited the film (originally titled La Paura in the Italian-dubbed version) and re-released it as Non credo più all'amore. In this edited version, a fishing scene is shortened and an explanatory narration is added to two silent scenes. In addition, the ending was changed from a scene showing Bergman attempting suicide to a scene showing her family in the countryside, after Bergman had left her husband, living on for the sake of her children.

The Rossellini Project
This initiative involves 10 films by Roberto Rossellini that are being digitally restored and will then be promoted internationally. Carrying out the restoration work are Cinecittà Luce-Filmitalia, the Cineteca di Bologna, the Centro Sperimentale di Cinematografia, and the Coproduction Office.

Fear is one of the ten films being restored. The others are:
Rome, Open City (Roma città aperta), Paisan (Paisà), Germany Year Zero (Germania anno zero), L’amore, Stromboli (Stromboli terra di Dio), The Machine that Kills Bad People (La Macchina ammazzacattivi), Journey to Italy (Viaggio in Italia), India: Matri Bhumi, and Interview with Salvador Allende (Intervista a Salvador Allende: La forza e la ragione).

North American TV release
On 15 March 2013, Turner Classic Movies broadcast Fear for the first time on TV in North America.

See also
Other film adaptations of Stefan Zweig's novella are:
 Angst (1928)
 La Peur (1936)

References

External links
 
 
 1979 New York Times film review by Vincent Canby
 The Rossellini Project
 Harvard University Film Archive screened Fear on July 21 and 23, 2005 as part of its summer exhibition of films. 
 Cinema of the World - Review of Fear that also includes movie stills.
 Dennis Grunes Review of Fear.

1954 films
1954 drama films
Italian drama films
German drama films
West German films
1950s German-language films
Films directed by Roberto Rossellini
Films based on works by Stefan Zweig
Films based on Austrian novels
Italian black-and-white films
Films set in West Germany
Adultery in films
Italian remakes of foreign films
Remakes of German films
Films about fear
Minerva Film films
Films scored by Renzo Rossellini
German black-and-white films
1950s Italian films
1950s German films